Lisa Brabham is a former racing driver. She is also the wife of David Brabham, mother of Sam Brabham, sister of Mike Thackwell and daughter of Ray Thackwell.

Lisa Thackwell was born in New Zealand and moved with her family to Perth, Western Australia at an early age. The family then moved to England in 1976 when she was eleven.

Thackwell first drove a racing car, a Renault 5 Cup, aged 21 through her father's business connections. After one season in Renault 5, she switched to the Honda CRX Challenge with Edenbridge Racing. Her team mates were Andy Ackerley and Patrick Watts. She raced in the British Rover GTi Championship in 1992.

Thackwell married David Brabham in 1993. They have two sons – Sam and Finn.

References

New Zealand racing drivers
1960s births
Living people